The 2000–01 Honduran Segunda División was the 34th season of the Honduran Segunda División.  Under the management of Oswaldo Altamirano, Real Maya won the tournament after defeating Comayagua F.C. in the final series and obtained promotion to the 2001–02 Honduran Liga Nacional.

Postseason

Octagonal

 Comayagua won 2–1 on aggregated.

 Atlético Independiente won 3–1 on aggregated.

 Real Maya won 1–0 on aggregated.

 Real Sociedad 1–1 Olimpia B on aggregated.  Real Sociedad won on penalty shoot-outs.

Semifinals

 Comayagua won 2–1 on aggregated.

 Real Maya won 7–4 on aggregated.

Final

 Real Maya won 3–2 on aggregated.

References

Segunda
2000